The Assembly of French Citizens Abroad is the political body that represents French citizens living outside France. The assembly advises the government on issues involving French nationals living outside France, as well as the role of France in overseas developments. Membership consists of 90 representatives elected among and by an electorate composed of all 442 elected consular representatives (themselves elected directly by all 3 Million French citizens living outside of France), across 15 worldwide electoral districts.

History
The issue of representation for French nationals abroad was first addressed in the French Fourth Republic (1946–1958). Three seats were allocated to the Council of the Republic (the then-upper house of Parliament), representing citizens residing in Europe, America and Asia-Oceania. In addition, there were four agencies based in Paris also representing French interests abroad: the Union of French Chambers of Commerce Abroad, the Federation of French Teachers Abroad, the Federation of French Veterans Residing Outside France, and the Union of French Citizens Abroad (UFE). The conflict between these organization and the National Assembly in appointing the three members of the Council of the Republic led to the decision to form an entirely new body to represent French citizens abroad.

Foreign minister Georges Bidault signed the decree establishing the High Council of French Citizens Abroad (CSFE) in July 1948. The CSFE consisted of 55 members: the three Councillors of the Republic representing French nationals abroad, the presidents of the four organizations above, 42 elected members, and five members appointed by the Minister of Foreign Affairs. The first elections were held in 1970 in 70 countries.

Turnout in these elections suffered a decline from 1997, which prompted efforts to extensively reform the CSFE. It was renamed the Assembly of French Citizens Abroad. The proportion of elected members was further increased. In addition, the electoral boundaries were revised to account for the changing demographics of French nationals abroad.

Role
The assembly is tasked with protecting the interests of French citizens abroad on issues such as the teaching of French, rights as citizens, social and economic problems, and taxation. They advise the French government on issues concerning French nationals living outside France and the role of France in overseas developments. The assembly also appoints representatives to various public agencies in France, including the National Stock Exchange, Permanent Commission for Employment and Vocational Training of French Citizens Abroad, etc.

The assembly meets four times a year. Bureau meetings take place in June and December, while plenary sessions are held in March and September.

Organization

Members
The AFE is composed of 90 members elected by universal suffrage from 15 districts around the world who serve six-year terms

Secretariat
Day-to-day affairs are run by a general secretariat. The secretary general is appointed by the Minister of Foreign Affairs.

Committees
Members also join committees which prepare reports on specific issues which are submitted to the council's sessions. The permanent committees include:
Commission of Laws, Regulations and Consular Affairs
Commission of Security and Protection of People and Property
Commission of Education, Cultural Affairs, Worldwide Audiovisual and Francophonie
Commission of Social Affairs and Military Veterans
Commission of Finance, Budget and Taxation
Commission of Foreign trade, Sustainable Development, Employment and Training

Elections
Elections to the assembly are staggered based on geographical location.

The 90 elected seats are distributed among 15 electoral districts proportional to population. The districts are as follows:

Composition
Members organize themselves into political groups. A minimum of 10 members is required to form a group. The assembly currently consists of five groups.

See also

French diaspora
Senate of France
National Assembly of France
List of senators of French citizens living abroad
List of diaspora organizations

References

External links
 Assemblée des Français de l'étranger — Official site

French diaspora
Government of France
Overseas French organisations